Mauricio Alejandro Zenteno Morales (born 21 April 1984) is a Chilean footballer that currently plays for Primera División club Deportes Iquique as a centre back.

Honours

Club
Universidad Católica
 Primera División de Chile (1): 2005 Clausura

Deportes Iquique
 Copa Chile (1): 2013–14

References

External links
 Mauricio Zenteno at Football-Lineups
 
 

1984 births
Living people
Chilean footballers
Chile international footballers
Club Deportivo Universidad Católica footballers
C.D. Huachipato footballers
Deportes Iquique footballers
Deportes La Serena footballers
Chilean Primera División players
People from Linares
Association football defenders